The 31st Sarasaviya Awards festival (Sinhala: 31වැනි සරසවිය සම්මාන උළෙල) were held to honor the best films of both 2005 and 2006 from the Sinhala cinema industry on the 5 April 2007 at the Bandaranaike Memorial International Conference Hall, Colombo. The ceremony was hosted by Gamini Samarasinghe.

Awards

2005

2006

References

Sarasaviya Awards
Sarasaviya